Osvaldo Toriani (July 24, 1937 – September 24, 1988) was an Argentine footballer who played as a goalkeeper.

Career 
Toriani played with Unión de Mar del Plata in 1955. He played in the Argentine Primera División in 1958 with Club Atlético Tigre. The following season he played in the Primera Nacional with Tigre. In 1960, he played with Club Atlético Independiente, and assisted in securing the league title in 1960, and 1963. He also assisted Independiente in winning the 1964 Copa Libertadores, and 1965 Copa Libertadores. In 1967, he signed with Newell's Old Boys.

In 1971, he played abroad in Colombia's Categoría Primera A with América de Cali. In the summer of 1972 he played in the National Soccer League with Toronto Italia. During his tenure with Toronto he assisted in securing the NSL Championship. In 1973, he signed with Colombian rivals Independiente Medellín. He played in the North American Soccer League with Miami Toros. In his debut season with Miami he featured in the NASL Championship final against Los Angeles Aztecs, but lost the match in a penalty shoot-out. In total he played in 34 matches with Miami.

Personal life 
On September 24, 1988 he committed suicide by an overdose of barbiturates and inhaling carbon monoxide from a lit brazier.

References

External links 
 NASL stats

1937 births
1988 deaths
1988 suicides
Association football goalkeepers
Argentine footballers
Argentine expatriate footballers
Unión de Mar del Plata footballers
Club Atlético Tigre footballers
Club Atlético Independiente footballers
Newell's Old Boys footballers
América de Cali footballers
Toronto Italia players
Independiente Medellín footballers
Miami Toros players
Argentine Primera División players
Primera Nacional players
Categoría Primera A players
Canadian National Soccer League players
North American Soccer League (1968–1984) indoor players
North American Soccer League (1968–1984) players
People from Zárate, Buenos Aires
Expatriate soccer players in Canada
Expatriate footballers in Colombia
Expatriate soccer players in the United States
Argentine expatriate sportspeople in Canada
Argentine expatriate sportspeople in Colombia
Argentine expatriate sportspeople in the United States
Drug-related suicides in Argentina
Barbiturates-related deaths
Suicides by carbon monoxide poisoning
Sportspeople from Buenos Aires Province